Field of Glory is a series of turn-based strategy games published by British company Slitherine Software for personal computers. The series is based on a 2008 miniature wargame.

Board game
Field of Glory is a 2008 miniature wargame for creating ancient and medieval tabletop battles. It was designed by Richard Bodley Scott and published by Slitherine Software and Osprey Publishing. The release of the game and two companion books (Rise of Rome and Storm of Arrows) were announced on December 20, 2007 for February 2008. A third edition was released on October 17, 2017.

Wargamer gave the game a positive review: "On a 1 to 10 scale I’d give Field of Glory a skosh over 9, but only for intermediate or advanced players. Given that most players who already compete in ancients tourneys are at this level anyway, this should not be a problem, but beginners will likely get lost in the complexity if not nurtured."

In 2017, Wargamer reviewed the third edition and gave it a positive review: "For current Field of Glory players this strongly recommended, but for everyone else it's optional."

Video games

Field of Glory
Field of Glory is the first game in the series, a digital version of the board game. It was released on November 19, 2009 for Windows and developed by British studio Hexwar. An OS X port was released on June 30, 2010. It was ported by Freeverse Inc.. Four expansion packs were released in 2010: Rise of Rome, Storm of Arrows, Immortal Fire, and Swords & Scimitars. Three expansions packs were released in 2011: Legions Triumphant, Eternal Empire, and Decline and Fall. Two expansion packs were released in 2016: Oath of Fealty and Wolves from the Sea. Alongside the last two expansions, the game was remade for the Unity game engine.

Armchair General gave the game a rating of 88% and said: "Overall, Field of Glory continues Slitherene’s tradition of fine-tuned, fast-playing games. FoG is easy to play and learn but more difficult to master." Digitally Downloaded gave the game four out of five stars and called it a "hugely entertaining game". Roberto Bertoni of Eurogamer Italy gave the game six out of ten and said: "Field of Glory is nothing more than an electronic board game. All is pretty tasteless but also very functional. Some flaws in the AI make the game more enjoyable in multiplayer rather than in single player."

Field of Glory II
Field of Glory II was released on October 12, 2017, developed by Byzantine Games. It uses the same game engine as Byzantine's previous games: Sengoku Jidai and Pike and Shot. Several DLC packs were released: Immortal Fire in 2017, Legions Triumphant, Age of Belisarius, and Rise of Persia in 2018, Wolves at the Gate in 2019, and Swifter than Eagles in 2023.

Field of Glory II received generally favorable reviews upon its release. It holds an average of 84/100 on aggregate website Metacritic.

Tim Stone of Rock Paper Shotgun wrote about the beta version: "Like its forerunners, FoGII produces gripping battle after gripping battle. Even the three tutorial skirmishes are absorbing. The beta leaves me questioning Byzantine's campaign thinking, but confident the PC is about to get something it's been without for a very long time – an ancient wargame with popular appeal and historical heft."

Field of Glory: Empires
Field of Glory Empires was developed by AGEod and released on July 11, 2019. It is set from 310 BC until the end of 2nd century AD in Ancient Rome. A DLC pack, Persia 550 – 330 BCE, was released on May 21, 2020.

Reception
Field of Glory Empires received generally favorable reviews upon its release. It holds an average of 76/100 on aggregate website Metacritic. The game was often compared to Imperator: Rome, another 2019 strategy game about the Roman Empire.

Strategy Gamer said that "Empires lacks the breadth Imperator has striven for and is a few years behind what Total War is doing these days, but it's a smartly made game and gives a deeper military experience for those who prefer those aspects. It's definitely one to consider and an excellent new contender in the grand strategy space."

Bill Gray of Wargamer gave the game a positive review and called it "one of the best ancient grand strategy games on the market".

Jörg Luibl of 4Players said that "This is dreary, sometimes plain boring and frustrating. Even if you get into the mechanics thanks to YouTube-videos (!), there are way too many shortcomings."

Tim Stone of Rock Paper Shotgun summarized: "I'd be surprised if Field of Glory: Empires didn't go down as one of 2019s best grand strategy offerings. At the very least it looks certain to be remembered as an essential add-on for the finest Ancients tactical wargame around."

Gamepressure listed Empires among the best strategy games of 2019.

Field of Glory II: Medieval

Field of Glory II: Medieval, a sequel to Field of Glory II, was released on February 4, 2021 and developed by Byzantine Games. It is set in the medieval era covering years from 1040 to 1270 AD. Several DlC packs were released: Reconquista and Swords and Scimitars in 2021, Storm of Arrows, Rise of the Swiss, and Sublime Porte in 2022.

Field of Glory II: Medieval received generally favorable reviews upon its release. It holds an average of 75/100 on aggregate website Metacritic.

Jonathan Bolding of PC Gamer said that the game doesn't "feel medieval", elaborating: "The ruleset's emphasis on flanking maneuvers over numerical advantage makes a lot of sense in the ancients period, but it feels silly when three units of elite infantry can't make a squad of enemy recruits flee in a single simultaneous assault."

Bill Gray of Wargamer gave the game a positive review and said it is "easy to learn, easy to play, plays realistically" and "it looks spectacular".

Field of Glory: Kingdoms
Field of Glory: Kingdoms is to be released in 2023, developed by AGEod. It was announced on May 10, 2022 and is said to be similar to Field of Glory: Empires.

References

External links
Official board game website (archived)

Field of Glory series at BoardGameGeek

Board games introduced in 2008
Board wargames set in Ancient history
Board wargames set in the Middle Ages
Freeverse Inc. games
Grand strategy video games
MacOS games
Matrix Games games
Miniature wargames
Slitherine Software games
Turn-based strategy video games by series
Video game franchises
Video game franchises introduced in 2009
Video games based on board games
Video games developed in France
Video games developed in the United Kingdom
Video games set in antiquity
Video games set in the Middle Ages
Video games set in the Roman Empire
Video games with downloadable content
Video games with expansion packs
Windows games